Ijermaouas (Tarifit: Ijermawas, ⵉⵊⴻⵔⵎⴰⵡⴰⵙ; Arabic: إجرماواس) is a commune in Driouch Province, Oriental, Morocco. At the time of the 2004 census, the commune had a total population of 11,288 people living in 1789 households.

References

Populated places in Driouch Province
Rural communes of Oriental (Morocco)